The Shadow Ministry of Bill Shorten was the opposition Australian Labor Party shadow ministry from October 2013 to May 2019, opposing the Abbott Government, Turnbull Government and Morrison Government.

The Opposition Front Bench is a group of senior Opposition spokespeople who are regarded as the alternative Cabinet to the Cabinet of Australia, whose members shadow or mark each individual Minister or portfolio of the Government. Neither the Shadow Cabinet nor the Shadow Ministers have any official status in the Parliament of Australia. The Shadow Cabinet's membership is determined by the rules and practices of the Opposition party.

From 2013 Labor leadership ballot resulting from the 2013 Australian federal election, to 2019, the Shadow Cabinet was led by former Opposition Leader Bill Shorten of the Australian Labor Party. Prime Minister Scott Morrison of the Liberal/National Coalition led the First Morrison Ministry from 2018 to 2019.

First Shadow Ministry (2013-2016)

First arrangement

Outer Shadow Ministry

Shadow Parliamentary Secretaries

Final arrangement 
During this term, Michelle Rowland and Katy Gallagher was promoted to the Shadow Cabinet. The final arrangement of the Shadow Ministry prior to the 2016 election was announced in October 2015.

Outer Shadow Ministry

Shadow Parliamentary Secretaries

Second Shadow Ministry (2016-2019)

First arrangement 
Following the narrow defeat at the 2016 election, the Australian Labor Party re-elected Bill Shorten and Tanya Plibersek as leader and deputy leader respectively. On 23 July 2016, the Shadow Cabinet was announced.

Outer Shadow Ministry

Shadow Assistant Ministers

Final arrangement

Outer Shadow Ministry

Shadow Assistant Ministers

See also 
 Cabinet of Australia
 Shadow Ministry of Australia
 Shadow Ministry of Kevin Rudd
 Second Rudd Ministry
 Abbott Ministry
 First Turnbull Ministry
 Second Turnbull Ministry
 First Morrison Ministry

References 

Politics of Australia
Opposition of Australia
Shorten